The Essex National Heritage Area is a National Heritage Area composed of all of Essex County, Massachusetts. It is overseen by the Essex National Heritage Commission (ENHC), a non-profit organization based in Salem, Massachusetts. The commission promotes the cultural heritage with public and private partnerships and with the National Park Service by developing programs that enhance, preserve and encourage regional awareness of the area's unique historic, cultural and natural resources.

Overview 

The heritage area covers all of Essex County, including 34 cities and towns, 9,968 sites listed on the National Register of Historic Places, 26 National Historic Landmarks, 9 state parks, and 2 National Park Service units.

Along with 2.7 million annual visitors, roughly 743,159 residents live in the region, which is in the Greater Boston metropolitan area.

Cities and towns 

The heritage area includes the Merrimack Valley cities of Lawrence, Haverhill, and Amesbury, Massachusetts, which were important industrial and trade centers in the 18th and 19th centuries and the birthplace of the Industrial Revolution in North America (along with nearby Lowell, Massachusetts), as well as the coastal cities of  Newburyport, Gloucester, Marblehead and Salem, Massachusetts, also important locations in early American trade and history.

Event and programs 
The Essex National Heritage Commission has sponsored a number of events and programs that celebrate the region’s history, character and cultural heritage. These include:

 Essex Heritage Partnership Grant Program
 Border to Boston – an Eight Community Recreational Path
 Teaching American History Grants
 Using ESSEX History
 LINCs
 Area Guides
 First Period Guide to Architecture
 Guide to the Great Outdoors
 Guide to Farms and Agriculture
 Trails & Sails: Two Weekends of Walks and Water
 Essex Heritage Explorers Membership Program
 Visitor Centers
 Heritage Landscape Inventory
 Essex Heritage Scenic Byway
 Photo Safaris

External links

References 

Essex County, Massachusetts
National Heritage Areas of the United States
Protected areas established in 1996
1996 establishments in Massachusetts
Protected areas of Essex County, Massachusetts
History of Lawrence, Massachusetts
Haverhill, Massachusetts
Amesbury, Massachusetts
Newburyport, Massachusetts
Gloucester, Massachusetts
Salem, Massachusetts